The United States Air Force's 450th Intelligence Squadron is an intelligence unit located at Ramstein Air Base, Germany.  The squadron was first activated in July 1974 as the 6950th Security Squadron and served as an intelligence gathering unit in the United Kingdom until inactivating in 1995.  It was reactivated in 2007. The Squadron's motto is Warbirds Never Quit!

Mission

History

Lineage
 Designated as the 6950th Security Squadron and activated on 1 July 1974
 Redesignated 6950th Electronic Security Group on 1 August 1979
 Redesignated 450th Intelligence Squadron on 1 October 1993
  Inactivated on 30 June 1995
  Activated on 12 July 2007

Assignments
 6950th Security Group, 1 July 1974 – 1 Oct 1978
 United States Air Force Security Service (later Electronic Security Command), 1 October 1978
 Electronic Security, Europe (later European Electronic Security Division), 30 September 1980
 693d Electronic Security Wing, 7 July 1988
 European Electronic Security Division, 23 May 1991
 26th Intelligence Wing, 1 October 1991
 26th Intelligence Group, 1 October 1993 – 30 June 1995
 693d Intelligence Group (later 693d intelligence, Surveillance and Reconnaissance Group), 12 July 2007 – present

Stations
 RAF Chicksands, England, 1 July 1974 – 30 June 1995
 Ramstein Air Base, Germany, 12 July 2007 – present

Awards

References

Notes

Bibliography

External links
 Air Force ISR Agency
 United States Air Forces in Europe: Ramstein Air Base, Germany

Intelligence squadrons of the United States Air Force